Lee "Scratch" Perry  (born Rainford Hugh Perry; 20 March 1936 – 29 August 2021) was a Jamaican record producer, composer and singer noted for his innovative studio techniques and production style. Perry was a pioneer in the 1970s development of dub music with his early adoption of remixing and studio effects to create new instrumental or vocal versions of existing reggae tracks. He worked with and produced for a wide variety of artists, including Bob Marley and the Wailers, Junior Murvin, The Congos, Max Romeo, Adrian Sherwood, Beastie Boys, Ari Up, The Clash, The Orb, and many others.

Early life 
Rainford Hugh Perry was born on 20 March 1936 in Kendal, Jamaica, in the parish of Hanover, the third child of Ina Davis and Henry Perry. His mother had strong African traditions originating from her Yoruba ancestry that she passed on to her son. His parents were both laborers, but his father later became a professional dancer.

Lee left school at age 15 and lived in Hanover where he did not have much regard for working, and preferred to play dominoes and live according to his own desires. He eventually wound up in Clarendon where he got into the dance and music scene and earned the nickname "The Neat Little Thing". Lee later moved to Kingston after experiencing a mystical connection to stones ("When the stones clash, I hear like the thunder clash... and I hear words... These words send me to Kingston. Kingston means King's Stone, the Son of the King... the stone that I was throwing in Negril send me to King Stone for my graduation.") where he apprenticed at Studio One.

Career

Early work
Perry's musical career began in the late 1950s as a record seller for Clement Coxsone Dodd's sound system. As his sometimes turbulent relationship with Dodd developed, he found himself performing a variety of important tasks at Dodd's Studio One hit factory, going on to record nearly thirty songs for the label. Disagreements between the pair due to personality and financial conflicts led him to leave the studio and seek new musical outlets. He soon found a new home at Joe Gibbs's Amalgamated Records.

Working with Gibbs, Perry continued his recording career but, once again, financial problems caused conflict. Perry broke ranks with Gibbs and formed his own label, Upsetter Records, in 1968. His first major single "People Funny Boy", which was an insult directed at Gibbs, sold well with 60,000 copies sold in Jamaica alone. It is notable for its innovative use of a sample (a crying baby) as well as a fast, chugging beat that would soon become identifiable as "reggae". Similarly his acrimonious 1967 single as Lee "King" Perry, "Run for Cover", was likewise aimed at Sir Coxsone.

From 1968 until 1972, he worked with his studio band the Upsetters. During the 1970s, Perry released numerous recordings on a variety of record labels that he controlled, and many of his songs were popular in both Jamaica and the United Kingdom, where his instrumental "The Return of Django" was a top five hit in 1969. He soon became known for his innovative production techniques as well as his eccentric character.

In 1970, Perry produced and released the Wailers track "Mr. Brown" (1970) with its unusual use of studio effects and eerie opening highlighting his unique approach to production.

The Black Ark
In 1973, Perry built a studio in his back yard, the Black Ark, to have more control over his productions and continued to produce notable musicians such as Bob Marley and the Wailers, Junior Byles, Junior Murvin, the Heptones, the Congos, and Max Romeo. He also started the Black Ark label, on which many of the productions from the studio appeared. With his own studio at his disposal, Perry's productions became more lavish, as the energetic producer was able to spend as much time as he wanted on the music he produced. Virtually everything Perry recorded in The Black Ark was done using basic recording equipment; through sonic sleight-of-hand, Perry made it sound unique. Paul Douglas mentions: "Scratch had a particular sound and everybody was fascinated by his sound. He had this way of putting things together; it was just his sound and it influenced a lot of people. I’ve even gone to the Black Ark with Eric Gale for that Negril album; I remember myself and Val Douglas, we laid some tracks there, Eric Gale overdubbed stuff on there, but I honestly don't remember what happened to it."

Perry remained behind the mixing desk for many years, producing songs and albums that stand out as a high point in reggae history.

By 1978, stress and unwanted outside influences began to take their toll: both Perry and the Black Ark quickly fell into a state of disrepair. Eventually, the studio burned to the ground. Perry has constantly insisted that he burned the Black Ark himself in a fit of rage.

After the Black Ark (1980s and 1990s)

After the demise of the Black Ark in the early 1980s, Perry spent time in England and the United States, performing live and making erratic records with a variety of collaborators. His career took a new path in 1984 when he met Mark Downie (Marcus Upbeat) with whom he worked on the 1986 album Battle of Armagideon for Trojan. It was not until the late 1980s, when he began working with British producers Adrian Sherwood and Neil Fraser (who is better known as Mad Professor), that Perry's career began to get back on solid ground again. Perry also attributed a later resurgence of his creative muse to his deciding to quit drinking alcohol and smoking cannabis. In his earlier days, the act of producing for Perry was a frenzied and ritualistic one where he stated that "he blew smoke into the microphone so that the weed would get into the song." Perry stated in an interview that he wanted to see if "it was the smoke making the music or Lee Perry making the music. I found out it was me and that I don't need to smoke."

In 1998, Perry reached a wider global audience as vocalist on the track "Dr. Lee, PhD" from the Beastie Boys' album Hello Nasty.

Later career
In 2003, Perry won a Grammy for Best Reggae Album with the album Jamaican E.T. In 2004, Rolling Stone ranked Perry number 100 on their list of the 100 Greatest Artists of All Time. He teamed up with a group of Swiss musicians and performed under the name Lee Perry and the White Belly Rats, and toured the United States in 2006 and 2007 using the New York City-based group Dub Is a Weapon as his backing band.

After meeting Andrew W.K. at SXSW in 2006, Perry invited him to co-produce his album Repentance. The album, released on 19 August 2008 through Narnack Records, featured several guest artists including Moby, Ari Up, producer Don Fleming, drummer Brian Chippendale, and bassist Josh Werner.

In 2007, Perry's song "Enter the Dragon" was sampled on the track "Carrots" by Panda Bear of Animal Collective. As well, Perry was selected by Animal Collective in 2011 to perform at All Tomorrow's Parties, which the band curated in May 2011. That same year, he recorded Rise Again with bassist and producer Bill Laswell; the album featured contributions from Tunde Adebimpe, Sly Dunbar, and Bernie Worrell, and was released on Laswell's M.O.D. Technologies label.

In 2008, Perry reunited with Adrian Sherwood on The Mighty Upsetter. Between 2007 and 2010, Perry recorded three albums with British producer Steve Marshall who he met at Pyramid Arts Development in Hackney. The albums featured performances by Keith Richards and George Clinton. Two of these albums, End of an American Dream (2008) and Revelation (2010), received Grammy nominations in the category Best Reggae Album.

In 2009, Perry collaborated with Dubblestandart on their Return from Planet Dub double album, revisiting some of his material from the 1970s and 1980s, as well as collaborating on new material with Dubblestandart, some of which also included Ari Up of the Slits. In 2008, leading up to this release, Perry's first foray into the dubstep genre was released on 12" vinyl, a collaboration with Dubblestandart and New York City's Subatomic Sound System called "Iron Devil". That record was followed by several more reggae-oriented dubstep collaborations with Dubblestandart and Subatomic Sound System on digital and vinyl, first Blackboard Jungle volumes 1 and 2 (2009), featuring dancehall vocalist Jahdan Blakkamoore, then Chrome Optimism (2010), which also featured American filmmaker David Lynch. Following that, in 2010, Perry and Ari Up of the Slits collaborated on a limited-edition Subatomic Sound System 7" called "Hello, Hell Is Very Low", a rootical dubstep release that would turn out to be one of Ari Up's last recordings and the final release during her lifetime.

In 2010, Perry had his first ever solo art exhibition at Dem Passwords art gallery in Los Angeles, California. The show, titled "Secret Education", featured works on canvas, paper, and a video installation.

In 2011, The Upsetter, a documentary film about Perry, narrated by Benicio Del Toro, was released worldwide in theaters after its premiere at the 2008 SXSW Film Festival. The film was directed and produced by American film makers Ethan Higbee and Adam Bhala Lough, and opened in Los Angeles in March 2011. It continued to screen worldwide into 2012, with the DVD, iTunes, and Video on Demand following soon thereafter.

In 2012, Perry teamed with the Orb to produce The Orbserver in the Star House, which was recorded in Berlin over a period of several months. The album earned critical acclaim, and featured the single "Golden Clouds", named after the historic property located near Perry's hometown in Jamaica. The recording sessions were filmed by Volker Schaner and were part of the documentary Lee Scratch Perry's Vision of Paradise.

In August 2012, it was announced that Perry would receive Jamaica's sixth highest honour, the Order of Distinction, Commander class.

In 2013, Perry performed at the first Dub Champions Festival in Vienna, a sold-out performance, backed by Dubblestandart with Adrian Sherwood handling the dub mix. Perry also performed at the first two Dub Champions Festivals in New York City in 2011 and 2012, backed by Subatomic Sound System. Perry performed at the 2013 Coachella Valley Music and Arts Festival in Indio, California.

Perry is featured as the DJ on the dub and reggae radio station "The Blue Ark" in Grand Theft Auto V. The station includes a number of dubs by Perry and the Upsetters including "Disco Devil" and "Grumblin' Dub".

In October 2013, it was announced that Perry will be awarded a Gold Musgrave Medal later that month by the Institute of Jamaica.

Perry recorded an album with Daniel Boyle in London, released in May 2014 as Lee "Scratch" Perry – Back on the Controls. The album received a Grammy nomination later that year.

Perry remixed the "Thor's Stone" single by UK producer Forest Swords in November 2013.

In 2015, the documentary Lee Scratch Perry's Vision of Paradise had a worldwide release in cinemas as well as on DVD and VOD after premiering at the East End Film Festival in London. The film gives an insight into the spiritual world of Perry, after director Volker Schaner spent more than 15 years filming with the Upsetters, witnessing the building of Perry's "Secret Laboratory" in Switzerland from the beginning until its destruction by fire in 2015. Shot in Switzerland, Jamaica, London, and Berlin, the movie also shows scenes from Aksum and Lalibela, Ethiopia to provide necessary background information. Over the years, Schaner collected over 100 hours of unique scenes and they both still continue the work, planning to release a sequel.

In 2015, Perry worked together with Belgium-based band Pura Vida and released The Super Ape Strikes Again, which was mixed at The Last Ark Studio in Belgium using a combination of vintage gear and modern recording techniques.

In September 2015, Perry and Subatomic Sound System launched a 40th anniversary tour for Perry's 1976 album Super Ape. The tour began as part of Dub Champions Festival and continued over the next two years with more than 50 dates in North America and some isolated dates in Europe. Nearly every show was sold out on the 2015 and 2016 tours. It culminated with the release of the Super Ape Returns to Conquer album in September 2017 which debuted at number 2 on iTunes US reggae chart behind Bob Marley's remastered Legend album, and on number 3 on the Billboard reggae chart. Larry McDonald performed as part of the band and on the recorded album. A Kickstarter campaign was organized in 2015 by Emch of Subatomic Sound System to raise funds to build a custom 15-foot-tall gorilla similar to the one on the original album cover art. The Kickstarter campaign reached its goal and the gorilla appeared on stage during 2015 and 2016 tour dates.

In October 2018, Perry and Subatomic Sound System launched a 45th anniversary tour for the 1973 album Blackboard Jungle Dub, produced by Perry. The tour began in North America and tour posters includes the tag line "World's 1st dub album, Live for the first time". Rolling Stone published a preview of the tour.

2019 saw the release of The Revelation of Lee "Scratch" Perry, a film about the making of his 2010 album Revelation, directed by Steve Marshall for State of Emergency. The film features intimate behind the scenes footage of Perry at work in his home studio in the Swiss Alps and an in depth interview with him.

In April 2019, hip hop producer Mr. Green announced that he would be doing a record made out of Perry's famous audio stems. In July 2019, Perry announced that the record is entitled Super Ape vs. 緑: Open Door and that it would release through Tuff Kong Records on 19 August 2019. The record combined over 20 different genres of music. Hypebeast said it was "Perry's best work in years" and that it "pushes boundaries of various genres. The record reached the Top 10 on the iTunes reggae chart and the Top 100 on the Billboard reggae chart.

A couple of weeks prior to his death, Perry released his last song, "No Bloody Friends". The song was a collaboration with Ral Ston, and it was released on August 13, 2021.

Perry's final album was with New Age Doom, titled Lee "Scratch" Perry's Guide to the Universe (2021). Perry's final dub production was for Sly & Robbie vs. Roots Radics, The Dub Battle (2021).  The song was "The Gates of Dub" with Max Romeo and The Roots Radics band produced by Hernan "Don Camel" Sforzini.

Personal life
Perry resided in Switzerland with his wife Mireille and their two children. He had four other children by the names of Cleopatra Perry, Marsha Perry, Omar Perry, and Marvin (Sean) Perry in various parts of the world. In 2015, his new studio in Switzerland, the "Secret Laboratory", was damaged by a fire that also destroyed his stage costumes and unreleased recordings.

Death
Perry died on 29 August 2021 at the Noel Holmes hospital in Lucea, Jamaica, from an unspecified illness, aged 85.

Discography

Albums
 The Upsetters – The Upsetter (1969)
 The Upsetters – Return of Django (1969)
 The Upsetters – Clint Eastwood (1970)
 The Upsetters – Many Moods of the Upsetters (1970)
 The Upsetters – Scratch the Upsetter Again (1970)
 The Upsetters – Eastwood Rides Again (1970)
 Lee "Scratch" Perry – Africa's Blood (1972)
 The Upsetters – Scratch the Upsetter – Cloak and Dagger (1973)
 The Upsetters – Rhythm Shower (1973)
 The Upsetters – 14 Dub Blackboard Jungle (1973)
 The Upsetters – Double Seven (1974)
 King Tubby Meets the Upsetter – At the Grass Roots of Dub (1974)
 The Upsetters – Musical Bones (1975)
 The Upsetters – Return of Wax (1975)
 The Mighty Upsetter – Kung Fu Meets the Dragon (1975) 
 Lee Perry & The Upsetters – Revolution Dub (1975) 
 The Upsetters – Super Ape (1976)
 Lee Perry – Roast Fish Collie Weed & Corn Bread (1978)
 The Upsetters – Return of the Super Ape (1978)
 Lee "Scratch" Perry – The Return of Pipecock Jackxon (1980)
 Lee "Scratch" Perry – Black Ark In Dub (1981)
 Lee "Scratch" Perry & The Majestics – Mystic Miracle Star (1982) 
 Lee "Scratch" Perry – History, Mystery & Prophesy (1984)
 Lee 'Scratch' Perry and The Upsetters – Battle of Armagideon (Millionaire Liquidator) (1986)
 Lee 'Scratch' Perry + Dub Syndicate – Time Boom X De Devil Dead (1987)
 Lee "Scratch" Perry – Satan Kicked the Bucket (1988)
 Lee "Scratch" Perry with Mad Professor – Mystic Warrior (1989)
 Lee "Scratch" Perry with Mad Professor – Mystic Warrior Dub (1989)
 Lee "Scratch" Perry – Message from Yard (1990)
 Lee "Scratch" Perry – From the Secret Laboratory (1990)
 Lee "Scratch" Perry Meets Bullwackie – Satan's Dub (1990)
 Lee "Scratch" Perry – Spiritual Healing (1990) 
 Lee "Scratch" Perry – Lord God Muzik (1991)
 Lee "Scratch" Perry – The Upsetter and the Beat (1992)
 Lee "Scratch" Perry & Mad Professor – Black Ark Experryments (1995) 
 Lee "Scratch" Perry – Experryments at the Grass Roots of Dub (1995)
 Lee "Scratch" Perry featuring Mad Professor/Douggie Digital/Juggler – Super Ape Inna Jungle (1996) 
 Lee "Scratch" Perry – Who Put the Voodoo Pon Reggae (1996)
 Mad Professor & Lee " Scratch" Perry – Dub Take the Voodoo Out of Reggae (1996) 
 Lee "Scratch" Perry – Technomajikal (1997)
 Lee "Scratch" Perry – Dub Fire (1998) 
 Lee "Scratch" Perry – Fire in Dub (1998) 
 Lee "Scratch" Perry – On the Wire (2000)
 Mad Professor & Lee "Scratch" Perry – Techno Party (2000)
 Lee "Scratch" Perry & Niney the Observer – Station Underground Report (2001)
 Lee "Scratch" Perry – Jamaican E.T. (2002)
 Lee "Scratch" Perry – Alien Starman (2003)
 Lee "Scratch" Perry and the Whitebellyrats – Panic in Babylon (2004)
 Lee "Scratch" Perry – End of an American Dream (2007)
 Lee "Scratch" Perry – The Mighty Upsetter (2008)
 Lee "$cratch" Perry – Repentance (2008)
 Lee "Scratch" Perry – Scratch Came Scratch Saw Scratch Conquered (2008)
 Lee "Scratch" Perry & Adrian Sherwood – Dub Setter (2009) 
 Lee "Scratch" Perry – The Unfinished Master Piece (2010)
 Lee "Scratch" Perry – Revelation (2010)
 Lee "Scratch" Perry & Bill Laswell – Rise Again (2011)
 Lee "Scratch" Perry – Master Piece (2012)
 Lee "Scratch" Perry & ERM – Humanicity (2012)
 The Orb feat. Lee "Scratch" Perry – The Orbserver in the Star House (2012)
 The Orb feat. Lee "Scratch" Perry – More Tales from the Orbservatory (2013)
 Lee "Scratch" Perry – Back on the Controls (2014)
 Lee "Scratch" Perry & Pura Vida – The Super Ape Strikes Again (2015)
 Lee "Scratch" Perry – Must Be Free (2016)
 Lee "Scratch" Perry – Science, Magic, Logic (2017)
 Lee "Scratch" Perry & Subatomic Sound System – Super Ape Returns to Conquer (2017)
 Lee "Scratch" Perry – The Black Album (2018)
 Lee "Scratch" Perry – Alien Dub Massive (2019)
 Lee "Scratch" Perry & Woodie Taylor – Big Ben Rock (2019)
 Lee "Scratch" Perry – Rainford (2019)
 Lee "Scratch" Perry & Mr. Green – Super Ape vs. 緑: Open Door (2019)
 Lee "Scratch" Perry – Life of Plants (2019)
 Lee "Scratch" Perry – Heavy Rain (2019)
 Lee "Scratch" Perry – Live in Brighton (2020)
 Lee "Scratch" Perry – Lee Scratch Perry Presents The Full Experience (2020)
 Lee "Scratch" Perry and Spacewave – Dubz of the Root (2021)
 Lee "Scratch" Perry & Ral Ston – Friends (2021)
 Lee "Scratch" Perry & Ral Ston & Scientist – Scratch & Scientist Meet Ral Ston To Conquer The Evil Duppies (2021)
 Lee "Scratch" Perry & New Age Doom – Lee "Scratch" Perry's Guide to the Universe (2021)

Compilation albums
 DIP Presents the Upsetter (1975)
 Scratch on the Wire (1979)
 The Upsetter Collection (1981)
 Megaton Dub (1983)
 Arkology (1997)
 Ape-ology (2007)
 King Scratch Musical (2022)

Note: Perry has had numerous compilations come out under his name, with many being illegitimate. This list tries to round up a few more "essential" compilations.

Appearances
Co-wrote "Police and Thieves" with Junior Murvin. It was later covered by The Clash on their 1977 debut album, some versions of which include their Perry-produced single "Complete Control".
 "The Only Alternative" on the compilation Roots of Innovation – 15 And X Years On-U Sound (1994) by Dub Syndicate on On-U Sound label.
 "Dr. Lee, PhD" on the album Hello Nasty (1998) by Beastie Boys
 Appears on two tracks on the album Whaa! (2005) by Zuco 103
 Starred in a series of Guinness advertisements (2008)
 Appears on two tracks on the album Nairobi meets Mad Professor: Wu Wei (2009) by Argentinian dub band Nairobi
 Appears on the single Golden Clouds (2012) by The Orb
 Appears on the album Aquarium in Dub (2020) by Aquarium and Levsha-Patsan
 Frayed Moon Magic Man & Man in The Baloon Feat. Lee Scratch Perry
 Appears on the album Sly & Robbie vs Roots Radics - The Final Battle (2019) by Sly & Robbie and Roots Radics produced by Hernan "Don Camel" Sforzini 
 Appears on the album Sly & Robbie vs Roots Radics - The Dub Battle (2021) by Sly & Robbie and Roots Radics produced by Hernan "Don Camel" Sforzini

Films
Lee Perry: Return of the Super Ape (BA BA ZEE) – Rick Elgood and Don Letts (UK)
Lee Scratch Perry's Vision of Paradise (2015) – directed by Volker Schaner, produced by Daniela Schmid
Scratch in Deutschland (1992) (10 minutes)
Ich sende aus dem All (1995) (30 minutes), directed by Peter Braatz
The Upsetter (90 minutes) (2011), directed by Ethan Higbee and Adam Bhala Lough narrated by Benicio del Toro
Tracks: Lee Perry (2005) (Arte) (France)

Videos
Jesus Perry Live – directed by InYourFaceTV (2013)
Golden Clouds – directed by Volker Schaner, collaboration with The Orb (2012)
Lee Scratch Perry: The Unlimited Destruction, 2002, US
Lee Scratch Perry: In Concert – The Ultimate Alien, 2003, US
Lee Scratch Perry with Mad Professor, 2004, US
Roots Rock Reggae – Inside the Jamaican Music Scene, 1977, directed by Jeremy Marre
Carrying the Swing – directed by Howard Johnson (1998)
Reggae: The Story of Jamaican Music (Part 2 – Rebel Music), 2002, Mike Connolly
Rock & Roll – Punk (10-part series) (US) (1995) (episode 9 only), a.k.a. Dancing in the Street: A Rock and Roll History (episode 8 only) (UK)
Tribute to Sister D – The Forum, London, 1995 (One Drop – Crazy Baldheads – Roastfish and Cornbread)
Portraits of Jamaican Music – directed by Pierre Marc Simonin (2003)
Jools in Jamaica – directed by Geoff Wonfor, presenter Jools Holland
Full Moon, plant a tree – directed by Juan Manuel Sicuso
The Gates of dub – directed by Juan Manuel Sicuso

Notes

References

Further reading
Collingwood, Jeremy (2010) Lee 'Scratch' Perry: Kiss Me Neck – The Scratch Story in Words, Pictures and Records, Cherry Red Books, 

David Katz and Jeremy Collingwood, Give Me Power: A Complete Discography, Trax on Wax
Gary Simons, Super Scratch: The Almost Complete Lee Perry Discography, 1999, Secret History Books

External links

Discography at Discogs

1936 births
2021 deaths
People from Manchester Parish
20th-century Jamaican male singers
Jamaican record producers
Jamaican reggae musicians
Jamaican songwriters
Dub musicians
Grammy Award winners
Trojan Records artists
Island Records artists
Commanders of the Order of Distinction
Recipients of the Musgrave Medal
Jamaican people of Yoruba descent
Music of the African diaspora
21st-century Jamaican male singers
Heartbeat Records artists